The 2007 Tro-Bro Léon was the 24th edition of the Tro-Bro Léon cycle race and was held on 22 April 2007. The race was won by Saïd Haddou.

General classification

References

2007
2007 in road cycling
2007 in French sport